An adulterant is caused by the act of adulteration, a practice of secretly mixing a substance with another. Typical substances that are adulterated include but are not limited to food, cosmetics, pharmaceuticals, fuel, or other chemicals, that compromise the safety or effectiveness of the said substance.

It will not normally be present in any specification or declared substances due to accident or negligence rather than intent, and also for the introduction of unwanted substances after the product has been made. Adulteration, therefore, implies that the adulterant was introduced deliberately in the initial manufacturing process, or sometimes that it was present in the raw materials and should have been removed, but was not. 

An adulterant is distinct from, for example, permitted food preservatives. There can be a fine line between adulterant and additive; chicory may be added to coffee to reduce the cost or achieve a desired flavor—this is adulteration if not declared, but may be stated on the label. Chalk was often added to bread flour; this reduces the cost and increases whiteness, but the calcium confers health benefits, and in modern bread, a little chalk may be included as an additive for this reason.

In wartime, adulterants have been added to make foodstuffs "go further" and prevent shortages. The German word ersatz is widely recognised for such practices during World War II. Such adulteration was sometimes deliberately hidden from the population to prevent loss of morale and propaganda reasons. Some goods considered luxurious in the Soviet Bloc such as coffee were adulterated to make them affordable to the general population.

In food and beverages

Past and present examples of adulterated food, some dangerous, include:

 Apple jellies (jams), as substitutes for more expensive fruit jellies, with added colorant and sometimes even specks of wood that simulate raspberry or strawberry seeds
 High fructose corn syrup or cane sugar, used to adulterate honey
 Red ochre–soaked brown bread to give the appearance of beef sausage for sausage roll filling.
 Roasted chicory roots used as an adulterant for coffee
 Water, for diluting milk and alcoholic beverages
 Water or brine injected into chicken, pork, or other meats to increase their weight
 Urea, melamine and other nonprotein nitrogen sources, added to protein products to inflate crude protein content measurements

History
Historically, the use of adulterants has been common; sometimes dangerous substances have been used. In the United Kingdom up to the Victorian era, adulterants were common; for example, cheeses were sometimes colored with lead. Similar adulteration issues were seen in industries in the United States, during the 19th century. There is a dispute over whether these practices declined primarily due to government regulation or to increased public awareness and concern over the practices.

In the early 21st century, cases of dangerous adulteration occurred in the People's Republic of China.

In some African countries, it is not uncommon for thieves to break electric transformers to steal transformer oil, which is then sold to the operators of roadside food stalls to be used for deep frying. When used for frying, it is reported that transformer oil lasts much longer than regular cooking oil. The downside of this misuse of the transformer oil is the threat to the health of the consumers, due to the presence of PCBs.

Adulterant use was first investigated in 1820 by the German chemist Frederick Accum, who identified many toxic metal colorings in food and drink. His work antagonized food suppliers, and he was ultimately discredited by a scandal over his alleged mutilation of books in the Royal Institution library. The physician Arthur Hill Hassall conducted extensive studies in the early 1850s, which were published in The Lancet and led to the 1860 Food Adulteration Act and other legislation. John Postgate led a further campaign, leading to another Act of 1875, which forms the basis of the modern legislation and a system of public analysts who test for adulteration.

At the turn of the 20th century, industrialization in the United States led to a rise in adulteration which inspired some protest. Accounts of adulteration led the New York Evening Post to parody:
Mary had a little lamb,
And when she saw it sicken,
She shipped it off to Packingtown,
And now it's labeled chicken.

However, even in the 18th century, people complained about adulteration in food:"The bread I eat in London is a deleterious paste, mixed up with chalk, alum and bone ashes, insipid to the taste and destructive to the constitution. The good people are not ignorant of this adulteration; but they prefer it to wholesome bread, because it is whiter than the meal of corn [wheat]. Thus they sacrifice their taste and their health. . . to a most absurd gratification of a misjudged eye; and the miller or the baker is obliged to poison them and their families, in order to live by his profession." – Tobias Smollett, The Expedition of Humphry Clinker (1771)

Incidents

 In 1981, denaturated Colza oil was added to Olive oil in Spain and 600 people were killed (See Toxic oil syndrome)
 In 1987, Beech-Nut was fined for violating the US Federal Food, Drug, and Cosmetic Act by selling flavored sugar water as apple juice.
 In 1997, ConAgra Foods illegally sprayed water on stored grain to increase its weight.
 In 2007, samples of wheat gluten mixed with melamine, presumably to produce inflated results from tests for protein content, were discovered in the USA. They were found to have come from China. (See: Chinese protein adulteration.)
 In 2008, significant portions of China's milk supply were found to have been adulterated with melamine. Infant formula produced from this milk killed at least six children and is believed to have harmed thousands of others. (See: 2008 Chinese milk scandal.)
 In 2012, a study in India across 29 states and union territories found that milk was adulterated with detergent, fat, and even urea, and diluted with water. Just 31.5% of samples conformed to FSSAI standards.
 In the 2013 meat adulteration scandal in Europe, horsemeat was passed off as beef.

See also
 Anthropogenic hazard
 Surrogate alcohol: harmful substances which are used as substitutes for alcoholic beverages
 Denatured alcohol: alcohol which is deliberately poisoned to discourage its recreational use
 Impurity
 Fake food
 Cutting agent

References

Further reading

 (1820) by Friedrich Accum

External links

 
Doping in sport
Drug culture
Food additives
Food industry
Food safety
Pejorative terms